Luis Enrique de León Valenzuela (born 14 November 1995), is a Guatemalan professional football player who plays for Liga Nacional club Cobán Imperial and the Guatemalan national team.

He debuted internationally in the Guatemala U-20 team in Group Stage of the 2015 CONCACAF U-20 Championship in Jamaica.

In 10 September 2019, de Léon made his senior debut ans scored his first goal for Guatemala against Puerto Rico in a 0–5 victory in the CONCACAF Nations League.

International goals
Scores and results list Guatemala's goal tally first.

Honours
Guastatoya
Liga Nacional de Guatemala: Clausura 2018

Municipal 
Liga Nacional de Guatemala: Apertura 2019

Cobán Imperial 
Liga Nacional de Guatemala: Apertura 2022

References

1995 births
Living people
Guatemalan footballers
Association football midfielders
Universidad de San Carlos players
C.D. Guastatoya players
C.S.D. Municipal players
Guatemala international footballers